Anne Trujillo is a broadcast news anchor at Denver 7 (KMGH-TV).

Trujillo currently anchors Denver7 News at 5:00, 6:00 and 10:00 Monday through Friday.

Trujillo started working at KMGH as a general assignment reporter. She attended the University of Colorado at Boulder and graduated with a B.S. in Journalism. She was named Best Anchor by Westword Magazine in 2006.  Anne was also named to the Silver Circle of NATAS National Academy of Television Arts & Sciences.

As of September 15, 2009, Trujillo was currently the longest tenured TV news anchor in Denver. She has been with KMGH for over 25 years.

References

Living people
Year of birth missing (living people)
Television anchors from Denver
Emmy Award winners
University of Colorado alumni